Summer School Teachers is a 1974 feature film directed and written by Barbara Peeters and starring Candice Rialson. It is about three female friends who all teach at a school over the summer.

It was an unofficial follow up to The Student Teachers (1973).

Plot
Three friends from Iowa go to California for the summer, rent an apartment together and teach at the same high school. PE teacher Conklin (Candice Rialson) coaches an all-girl football team despite the opposition of the resident coach (Dick Miller), and romances one of the male teachers. Sally (Pat Anderson) teaches photography and despite being engaged to a man back home, has affairs with an eccentric rock star with a food fetish, and with a male chauvinist teacher who talks her into posing nude for some photos. Chemistry teacher Denise (Rhonda Leigh Hopkins) becomes involved with one of her students, a juvenile delinquent, who is falsely accused of participating in car stealing. Conklin uncovers that funds for sport are being misspent by the coach. Both she and Sally are suspended but all ends happily with the girl football team triumphant.

Cast
Candice Rialson as Conklin
Pat Anderson as Sally
Rhonda Leigh Hopkins as Denise
Will Carney as Jeremy
Grainger Hines as Bob
Christopher Barrett as Jeff
Dick Miller as Sam
Vince Barnett as Principal Adams
Norman Bartold as Agwin
Michael Greer as John John Lacey
Barbara Pell as Janice
Ka-Ron Sowell Brown as Jessie
Merie Earle as Ethel
Cecil Elliott as Freida
John Kerry as Hiram

Production
Peeters enjoyed working for Roger Corman:
He is always available and he doesn't hire you unless he trusts you. As long as you open big and close big and try to resolve three stories in the end, Roger lets you do what you want. Just be sure you put in either a sex scene or an action sequence every 15 minutes.

Reception
The film was very popular. Roger Corman attributed this to its strong female liberation statement, which he thought was the strongest of any film made by New World Pictures.

The Los Angeles Times called it "an entertaining and breezy exploitation film... even though she operates on a very superficial level, screenwriter Peeters deals with real issues like the danger of labelling people or the trauma of teacher-student romance. As a director, Peeters excels in zany slapstick".

Diabolique magazine said the film was "feels like a screwball comedy rather than something sleazy. There is nudity... but the women are confident and in control: they do most of the seducing,  they stick up for each other and the sisterhood, and the messages are mostly positive – girls should be able to do whatever boys can do, physical fitness is good, corruption is bad. This is the best character Rialson ever played."

See also
 List of American films of 1974

References

External links

American exploitation films
1974 films
1970s English-language films
Films produced by Julie Corman
Films directed by Barbara Peeters
1970s American films